Earl William Edwards Jr. (born January 24, 1992) is an American professional soccer player who plays as a goalkeeper for Major League Soccer club New England Revolution.

College and amateur
Edwards spent his entire college career at UCLA, including a red-shirted year in 2010.  He made a total of 61 appearances for the Bruins and finished with 19 shutouts and a 1.07 Goals Against Average.  He was named first team All-Pac-12 in 2013 and 2014.

Edwards also played in the Premier Development League for Ventura County Fusion and Seattle Sounders FC U-23.

Professional career

Orlando City 
On January 20, 2015, Edwards was selected in the third round (43rd overall) of the 2015 MLS SuperDraft by Orlando City and signed a professional contract with the club a month later.  He made his professional debut on June 17 in a 2015 U.S. Open Cup match against Charleston Battery. Orlando went on to advance on penalties.

He was loaned to Orlando City B in March 2016 before becoming the first-choice keeper in the 2017 USL season.

He made his first MLS start on October 23, 2017 away at Philadelphia Union on the final day of the season when regular starter Joe Bendik was ruled out with concussion. Orlando lost 6–1.

On July 14, 2018, following James O'Connor's appointment as manager, he was given the start over a healthy Bendik in the midst of a nine-game losing streak. Orlando won 2–1 with Edwards registering 3 saves. Edwards would retain the starting job for five games, conceding 13 goals. He was released by the club at the end of the 2018 season when his contract expired.

D.C. United 
On December 19, 2018, Edwards was acquired by D.C. United in exchange for a second-round pick in the 2019 MLS SuperDraft. On January 8, 2020, Edwards was re-signed by D.C. United for the 2020 season. He was released by D.C. United on November 30, 2020.

Loudoun United 
Edwards has appeared in games for D.C. United's affiliate club, Loudoun United. He appeared the first time for Loudoun United in a game against the Tampa Bay Rowdies on March 31, 2019. He was able to keep a clean sheet in his debut as the game ended 0-0.

New England Revolution 
On December 19, 2020, Edwards joined MLS side New England Revolution ahead of their 2021 season.

International
Edwards was a member of the United States under-17 squad that competed at the 2009 FIFA U-17 World Cup in Nigeria.

Honors
New England Revolution
Supporters' Shield: 2021

References

External links

UCLA Bruins bio

1992 births
Living people
American soccer players
UCLA Bruins men's soccer players
Ventura County Fusion players
Seattle Sounders FC U-23 players
Orlando City SC players
Orlando City B players
D.C. United players
Loudoun United FC players
New England Revolution players
New England Revolution II players
Association football goalkeepers
Soccer players from San Diego
Orlando City SC draft picks
USL League Two players
USL Championship players
USL League One players
United States men's youth international soccer players
Major League Soccer players
MLS Next Pro players